The Louisville, New Orleans and Texas Railway was built between 1888 and 1890 and was admitted to the Illinois Central Railroad system in 1892. It ran between Memphis, Tennessee, and New Orleans, Louisiana, through Vicksburg, Mississippi, and Baton Rouge.

Companies
Iterations of the Louisville, New Orleans and Texas Railway include:
Clinton and Port Hudson Railroad 1889
Mississippi Valley and Ship Island Railroad 1884
Grand Gulf and Port Gibson Railroad 1881
Mobile and Northwestern Railroad 1891
Natchez, Jackson and Columbus Railroad 1890
West Feliciana Railway 1889

Legacy
The subsidiary Clinton and Port Hudson Railroad is commemorated by the Old Hickory Railroad, a narrow-gauge tourist railway in Jackson, LA.

References

External links
Railroads of the Illinois Central System

Defunct Louisiana railroads
Defunct Tennessee railroads
Defunct Mississippi railroads
Historic American Engineering Record in Mississippi
Predecessors of the Illinois Central Railroad
Railway companies established in 1884
Railway companies disestablished in 1892